The Pelahatchie City Hall and Masonic Hall in Pelahatchie, Mississippi is a historic building that was designated a Mississippi Landmark in 2007.

The ground floor of the building serves as the Pelahatchie City Hall.  The second floor serves as a meeting hall for Pelahatchie Lodge No. 276, F&AM (the local Masonic lodge).

References

Masonic buildings in Mississippi
Buildings and structures in Rankin County, Mississippi
Mississippi Landmarks
City and town halls in Mississippi